Iakovos Theofilas (born 22 October 1861, date of death unknown) was a Greek sport shooter. He competed in the 1906 Summer Olympics and in the 1912 Summer Olympics.

Career
Theofilas was born in Athens.

In 1906, he finished 18th in the free rifle, free position event. He also participated in the 200 m army rifle competition but did not finish the contest. Six years later at the 1912 Summer Olympics he participated in the following events:

 Team 25 metre small-bore rifle - fourth place
 Team 50 metre small-bore rifle - fifth place
 Team military rifle - seventh place
 25 metre small-bore rifle - 36th place
 50 metre rifle, prone - 37th place
 300 metre military rifle, three positions - 72nd place
 600 metre free rifle - 85th place

References

1861 births
Year of death missing
Greek male sport shooters
ISSF rifle shooters
Olympic shooters of Greece
Shooters at the 1906 Intercalated Games
Shooters at the 1912 Summer Olympics
Sportspeople from Athens